"I Want Love" is a 2001 song by English musician Elton John, co-written with Bernie Taupin, released as the first single from his Songs from the West Coast album. The song reached the top ten in Canada and the United Kingdom. In the US, "I Want Love" reached No. 10 on the Billboard "Bubbling Under" chart and number six on the Adult Contemporary chart. The song also featured in an advert for Royal Mail, in which John starred. It was nominated for a Grammy award in 2002 for Best Male Pop Vocal Performance.

"I Want Love" is present in the musical biopic film Rocketman, sung by a cast including Kit Connor, Steven Mackintosh, Bryce Dallas Howard and Gemma Jones.

Music video
{
  "type": "ExternalData",
  "service": "page",
  "title": "I Want Love.map"
}

The music video was shot with the actor Robert Downey Jr. walking through Greystone Mansion and lip-syncing the song. Video director Sam Taylor-Wood shot 16 takes of the video and used the last one because, according to John, Downey looked completely relaxed, and, "The way he underplays it is fantastic".

Charts

Weekly charts

Year-end charts

Chris Stapleton cover
Chris Stapleton covered "I Want Love" in the spring of 2018.  It is included on the compilation album, Restoration: Reimagining the Songs of Elton John and Bernie Taupin.

References

External links
 
 

2001 songs
2001 singles
Elton John songs
Chris Stapleton songs
The Rocket Record Company singles
Mercury Records singles
Songs with music by Elton John
Songs with lyrics by Bernie Taupin